Chepo may refer to:

Places
Chepo, Panamá Province, town in Panama
Chepo, Herrera Province, corregimiento in Panama
Chepo River, Panamanian river

People
Chepo (footballer) (born 1972), Honduran footballer

Other
Chepo F.C., Panamanian football team
Chepo expedition, expedition in Panama by Spanish pirates in 1679